Alexandre Alexandrovich Mnouchkine (10 February 1908, St. Petersburg, Russian Empire – 3 April 1993, Neuilly-sur-Seine, France) was a French film producer.

He moved to Paris in 1925. After his entry into cinema in 1932, he created Ariane Films in 1945. Alexandre Mnouchkine married twice, the second time to the comedian Simone Renant. He is the father of Ariane Mnouchkine. In 1987 he was a member of the jury at the 15th Moscow International Film Festival.

Selected filmography
He was the producer on 50 films, including:
 The Emigrant (1940)
 L'Aigle à deux têtes by Jean Cocteau (1948),
 The Cupid Club (1949)
 Julie de Carneilhan (1950)
 Fanfan la Tulipe by Christian-Jaque (1952),
 Madame du Barry (1954)
 Madelon (1955)
 Women's Club (1956)
 Les Gauloises bleues by Michel Cournot (1968),
 The Name of the Rose by Jean-Jacques Annaud (1986),
 6 films directed by Claude Lelouch,
 10 films directed by Philippe de Broca, including L'Homme de Rio and Dear Louise
 La Révolution française - episode "Les Années Lumière" by Robert Enrico.

Actor
 Le Voyou (1970)
 Touch and Go (1971) - L'homme en vélo-taxi (uncredited)
 L'aventure, c'est l'aventure (1972) - Davis (uncredited)
 Le Magnifique (1973) - Paramedic at the Back of Ambulance (uncredited)
 Illustrious Corpses (1976) - Pattos (uncredited)
 If I Had to Do It All Over Again (1976)
 Jupiter's Thigh (1980) - Hermann Von Blankenberg (uncredited)
 I Hate Actors (1986) - Zupelman
 Spirale (1987) - Gustav Stadler
 The African Woman (1990) - Andrej (final film role)

Awards 
 Honorary César award in 1982

References

External links 
 

1908 births
1993 deaths
Russian Jews
Soviet emigrants to France
French people of Russian-Jewish descent
French film producers
César Honorary Award recipients